Tashlykul (Taşlıkül) is a rural locality (a selo) in Gafuriysky Selsoviet, Buzdyaksky District, Bashkortostan, Russia. The population was 318 as of 2010. There are 3 streets.

Geography 
Tashlykul is located 8 km south of Buzdyak (the district's administrative centre) by road. Voznesenka is the nearest rural locality.

References 

Rural localities in Buzdyaksky District